Kealing is a surname. Notable people with the surname include: 

Ethel Black Kealing (1877–1960), American writer and arts patron
H. T. Kealing (1859–1918), American writer, educator, and churchman

See also
Keating (surname)